Engineers Lake, a small oval-shaped lake, has a surface area of . This lake is on the south side of Haines City, Florida, and is in a suburban area. It is bordered by residences, woods and grassland.

Engineers Lake has no public access along its shores. Permission of property owners must be obtained to reach this lake. The Take Me Fishing website says this lake contains largemouth bass and bluegill.

References

Lakes of Polk County, Florida